Roshan Lal (18 April 1910 – 1990) was an Indian politician. He was a Member of Parliament, representing Himachal Pradesh in the Rajya Sabha the upper house of India's Parliament as a member of the Indian National Congress. Lal died in 1990.

References

1910 births
1990 deaths
Indian National Congress politicians
Rajya Sabha members from Himachal Pradesh